George Keduolhou Angami is an Indian educator who is currently serving as the present Principal of 
St. Joseph's College, Jakhama in Nagaland. He previously served as the Vice Principal of the college.

Bibliography
Weakness in the Ministry of Paul: Literary and Theological Aspects in 1-2 Corinthians, 2018

References

Living people
Year of birth missing (living people)